The 19th Annual Nickelodeon Kids' Choice Awards was held on April 1, 2006, at UCLA’s Pauley Pavilion. They were hosted by actor/musician Jack Black. Chris Brown, Bow Wow, and P!nk performed.

The nominations were released on February 7, 2006. They include favorites from movies, television, music, and sports from 2005.

This Kids' Choice Awards was famous for being the KCA that almost never had a sliming. Robin Williams managed to prevent the show from being slimeless.

Winners and nominees
Winners are listed first, in bold. Other nominees are in alphabetical order.

Movies

Television

Music

Miscellaneous

Wannabe Award
 Chris Rock

References

External links
 
 Official 2006 Kids' Choice Awards website

Nickelodeon Kids' Choice Awards
Kids' Choice Awards
Kids' Choice Awards
Kids' Choice Awards
2006 in Los Angeles
Nick